Sachsenbrunn is a village and a former municipality in the district of Hildburghausen, in Thuringia, Germany. It includes the community of Stelzen. Since 1 January 2019, it is part of the town Eisfeld.

Culture
A notable cultural item in the village of Sachsenbrunn is its Tanzlinde, a lime tree that has had a dancing platform built around it. It is one of the best preserved examples of this in Germany.

References

Former municipalities in Thuringia
Hildburghausen (district)